The 1971–72 Tercera División season is the 38th since its establishment.

League tables

Group I

Group II

Group III

Group IV

Promotion playoff

Relegation playoff

Season records
 Most wins: 27, Real Murcia.
 Most draws: 16, Eldense.
 Most losses: 25, Candás and África Ceutí.
 Most goals for: 90, Cartagena.
 Most goals against: 91, África Ceutí.
 Most points: 62, Real Murcia.
 Fewest wins: 6, Candás and África Ceutí.
 Fewest draws: 5, Atlètic de Ciutadella.
 Fewest losses: 3, Real Murcia and Cartagena.
 Fewest goals for: 25, Oberena.
 Fewest goals against: 23, Barakaldo.
 Fewest points: 19, Candás and África Ceutí.

External links
RSSSF 
Futbolme 

Tercera División seasons
3
Spain